The Macedonians in Albania are an officially recognized ethnic minority. According to the 2011 census, 5,512 ethnic Macedonians live in Albania. In the 1989 census, 4,697 people had declared themselves Macedonian. 

The condition of the Macedonian population living in the Prespa area is described in positive terms and particular praise is given since all the villages of the area are allowed schooling in their mother tongue. Macedonian organizations allege that the government undercounts their number and that they are politically under-represented, arguing there are no Macedonians in the Albanian parliament, until Vasil Sterjovski was elected in 2019 representing the Macedonian Party. Past Helsinki reports stated, "Albania recognizes [...] a Macedonian minority, but only in the Southern regions. Those who identify as Macedonians [...] outside these minority regions are denied the minority rights granted in the south, including minority classes at state schools."

In some circumstances, ethnic identity can be fluid among Albania's Slavophonic population, who may identify as Macedonian or Bulgarian, depending on the circumstances. Albanian Slavs are targeted by "Bulgarian cross-border nationalism" and, as an EU member, Bulgaria offers more benefits to this minority than Macedonia does. According to Edmond Temelko, former mayor of the Pustec Municipality, "[...] Bulgaria uses heavy economic situation of Macedonians in Albania to offer them Bulgarian citizenship, passports and employment opportunity".

History
In the middle of the 19th century the national affiliation of the Orthodox Slavs of Macedonia became the locus of a contest between Greeks and Bulgarians, who intensified their national educational activity in the region, along with Serbia. According to Encyclopædia Britannica 1911 Edition, at the beginning of the 20th century the Slavs constituted the majority of the population in Macedonia. Per Britannica itself the bulk of the Slavs was regarded by almost all independent authorities as "Bulgarians". The partition of the Ottoman lands of the region of Macedonia between Balkan nation-states after the conclusion of the Balkan Wars (1912–1913) and World War I (1914–1918) left the area divided. The small Macedonian areas of Gollobordë and Mala Prespa were included in Albania. In the 1920s, the Albanians referred to orthodox Slavs in Albania as Bulgarians. The new Albanian state did not attempt to assimilate this minority.  On January 9, 1932, the Bulgarian and Albanian delegations signed in Sofia a protocol regarding the recognition of the ethnic Bulgarian minority in Albania. Belgrade was suspicious of the recognition of a Bulgarian minority in Macedonia and was annoyed this would hinder its policy of forced “Serbianisation” in Serbian Macedonia. It had already blocked the ratification of such protocol with Greece. Due to pressure from Yugoslavia, this protocol was also never ratified. However, in 1942 the Albanian-Italian census in today's western parts of North Macedonia, then part of the Albanian Kingdom, and today most eastern parts of Albania, was conducted for the ethnic composition of its Slavic population, that 31% from registered were Bulgarians and 8% were recorded as Serbs.

On the other hand, in 1934 the Comintern gave its support to the idea that the Macedonian Slavs constituted a separate nationality. Prior to the Second World War, this view on the Macedonian issue had no practical importance. During the War these ideas were supported by the pro-Yugoslav Macedonian communist partisans. After the Red Army entered the Balkans, new communist regimes came into power in the area. In this way their policy on the Macedonian Question was of supporting the development of a distinct ethnic Macedonian identity. As result the Slavic minority in Albania was recognized in 1945 as Macedonian. However, after the Fall of communism in 1998, the then foreign minister of Albania Paskal Milo, has stated on the Slav minority issue: "After World War II, we know this minority as Macedonian. I’d rather not elaborate on why we chose this way, but the Communist regime made this decision and it’s difficult for us now to change that." The former Prime Minister Aleksander Meksi openly admitted the presence of ethnic Bulgarians near the Lake Prespa. At the request of Bulgarian MEPs, the European Parliament Committee on Foreign Affairs brought up the issue of people with Bulgarian ethnicity that are located in the Prespa, Gollobordë and Gora regions. Following pressure from Bulgarian MEPs and petition from the local Bulgarian community, in 2017 the Albanian parliament recognized a Bulgarian minority in Albania. Its presence is supported by field researchers from Bulgaria, but is disputed by ethnic Macedonian activists there. According to Edmond Temelko, former mayor of the Pustec Municipality, "[...] Bulgaria uses heavy economic situation of Macedonians in Albania to offer them Bulgarian citizenship, passports and employment opportunity".

Population
External estimates on the population of Macedonians in Albania include 10,000, whereas Macedonian sources have claimed 120,000 to 350,000 Macedonians in Albania Despite high levels of emigration the official number of people registering as Macedonians in Albania has more than doubled over the last 60 years, according to Albanian census data.

In 2000, Albania conducted a census which did not record ethnic affiliation and as such during that time resulted in various estimates for the Slavic population of Albania that could not be checked and rectified. The then Macedonian immigration minister Martin Trenevski estimated in 2000 that the Macedonian minority in Albania numbered 300,000. After conducting personal visits to areas of Macedonian settlement in Albania, diplomat Geert Ahrens considered these numbers "grossly exaggerated", as did other Macedonian interlocutors.

In March 2009, the Commission for Minority Issues of the Foreign Ministry of Albania announced the results of its study about the national minorities in the country. According to the study, there are 4,148 Macedonians (0.14% of the total population) living in the country. The ethnic Macedonian organisations of Albania announced they will complain at Albanian institutions and international organisations.

Some believed the Albanian government had stated that it would jail anyone who did not participate in the census of 2011 or refused to declare their ethnicity.

The complication of counting the Macedonian minority in Albania is due to most Macedonian speakers being from a Muslim background with tendencies of not identifying as Macedonians, as even in Macedonia, Muslim Macedonian speakers are not in instances counted as Macedonians but as Torbeši or Gorani. As such Ahrens states that the overall estimate of the Slavic population of Albania ranges between 10,000 and 20,000 people.

Geographic distribution

Macedonians in Albania traditionally live in Pustec Municipality, Gollobordë, Dibër District, Korçë, Pogradec and Gora areas. Some, however, have moved to larger cities like Tirana, where roughly 500 ethnic Macedonians live as of the 2011 census.

Pustec Municipality (Mala Prespa)
Macedonians are only officially recognised as a minority population in Municipality of Pustec, on the shores of Lake Prespa.
The municipality consists of the following villages:

 Cerje
 Dollna Goricë
 Glloboçen
 Gorna Goricë
 Leskë
 Pustec
 Shulin
 Tuminec
 Zërnovskë

Devoll
Macedonians also inhabit the region to the south of Lake Prespa, within the Devoll municipality. A Macedonian minority can be found in the village of Vërnik, which is the only Macedonian-inhabited village in Albania considered in Macedonian sources to form a part of Aegean Macedonia. Historically the village of Rakickë was a mixed village in 1900 whose population consisted of 360 Albanians and 300 Orthodox Macedonians, though by the 1970s had become a wholly Albanian inhabited village.

Korçë region
Two traditionally Orthodox Slavic speaking villages of the Korçë region existed until the 1960s when ethnic and linguistic changes occurred resulting in part of the Slavic population moving away while those remaining became assimilated. Drenovë has become inhabited by Orthodox Albanians and Aromanians with the last person speaking a Slavic language passing away in the 2000s and Boboshticë has become mainly inhabited by Aromanians with only a few remnants left of its former Slavic speaking population. In the 2010s, only one elderly women remains in Boboshticë who is a speaker of the village local Macedonian dialect called Kajnas (of us). The Gorica dialect of Macedonian is used by the Macedonian inhabitants of this region.

Lake Ohrid region
Macedonians can be found in the village of Lin, living alongside Muslim Albanians. The Macedonians of Lin speak Vevčani-Radožda dialect of Macedonian. Linguists Klaus Steinke and Xhelal Ylli conducted fieldwork in the village and noted it to be a mixed village of Orthodox Christians and Muslims having 1680 inhabitants and 296 families. Local Lin villagers stated that few families speak Macedonian, such as in instances of marriage with women from neighbouring Radožda in the Republic of Macedonia, however, Macedonian overall is not used by the third generation.

Gollobordë
Macedonians also form a significant population in the Gollobordë region, however there is a significant minority of Albanians. Macedonian populations can be found in the following places:

Trebisht administrative unit: Gjinovec ( or Гинеец/Gineec) and Klenjë are inhabited solely by a Slavic speaking population which contain Macedonian Muslim (Torbeš). Vërnicë is inhabited by an Albanian population that dominates demographically in the village that also contains a significant population of Muslim Macedonians and Orthodox Macedonians. Trebisht is traditionally inhabited by a mixed Slavic Orthodox Christian Macedonian and Macedonian Muslim population.

Ostren administrative unit: Lejçan, Lladomericë and Tuçep are inhabited solely by Macedonian Muslims; Radovesh, Kojavec, Orzhanovë are inhabited solely by a Slavic speaking population which contain Macedonian Muslims. Okshtun i Madh, Okshtun i Vogël and Tërbaç have some Macedonian Muslims residing there while Pasinkë, Ostren i Madh() and Ostren i Vogël are inhabited by an Albanian population that dominates demographically in the villages that also contain significant populations of Muslim Macedonians and Orthodox Macedonians.

Stëblevë administrative unit: Steblevë ( or Стебљево/Stebljevo) is inhabited solely by a Slavic speaking population that contains Macedonian Muslims. Sebisht is inhabited by an Albanian population that dominates demographically in the village and contains three families from the Muslim Macedonian and Orthodox Macedonian population.

Gjoricë administrative unit: Lubalesh has some Muslim Macedonians living in the village.

The Muslim Macedonian and Orthodox Macedonian population of Gollobordë are speakers of a south Slavic language (Macedonian). The Muslim Macedonian speaking community of the area is known as Gollobordas and in Albania people from the community are considered Albanians instead of Macedonians, even by the Albanian state, and they are known to intermarry with Muslim Albanians and not with Orthodox Macedonians. Until the 1990s the local Orthodox Macedonian minority, who have since migrated, used to live in some villages alongside the Gollobordas of whom in the 2010s number some roughly 3,000 people.

Fusha e Shehërit 
The area Fusha e Shehërit (valley of the city) is known in Macedonian sources as Dolno Pole ("southern valley") is situated south of the town of Peshkopi. Historically in the early 20th century, an Orthodox Slavic speaking population was found living alongside Muslim Albanians in the villages of Dovolan - minority, Herebel - majority, Kërçishti i Epërm - majority, Maqellarë ( or Макеларе/Makelare) - minority, and Katund i Vogël - minority. Toward the end of the 1920s the Orthodox Slavic speaking population was located in only two villages Herebel and Kërçisht i Epërm while in the 1930s the population decline of Orthodox Slavophones continued.

During the 2000s linguists Klaus Steinke and Xhelal Ylli seeking to corroborate villages cited in past literature as being Slavic speaking carried out fieldwork in villages of the area. In Herebel only 6 Orthodox Slavic speaking families made up of 3 larger households of around 20 individuals each remain. In Kërçisht i Epërm the village contains 200 inhabitants and 45 households, of which 6 are Orthodox families with a total of 17 individuals. On the eve of the collapse of communism in 1991, Kërçisht i Epërm had 110 households with 27 belonging to the Orthodox community.

Use of the Macedonian language in Kërçisht i Epërm is limited and facing extinction, due to usage being confined to the family. Albanian is also used in family settings especially by younger generations who have limited knowledge of Macedonian due to Albanian school influences and the demographic decline of the Slavic-speaking population in the village. Linguists Steinke and Ylli also noted that unlike the Gollobordë region, the villages of the Maqellarë administrative unit area do not have any Muslim Slavic speaking inhabitants, and the village of Katund i Vogël no longer has any Slavic Christians left and is inhabited only by Albanians.

Gora
Inhabitants of the Gora region (which straddles Albania, Kosovo and Macedonia) are Slavic-speaking Muslims who reside in the villages of Zapod, Pakisht, Orçikël, Kosharisht, Cernalevë, Orgjost, Orshekë, Borje, and Shishtavec. The Gorani community refer to their south Slavic speech as Našinski, while it is known as Gorançe by Albanians. Within the Gorani community there is a recognition of their dialects being closer to the Macedonian language, than to Serbian.

The estimated number of the Gorani community (combined both for Albania and Kosovo) ranges between 40,000–120,000. Sources from the Republic of Macedonia claim the Gorani people to be a subgroup of ethnic Macedonians. In the 2011 census, 11.7% of residents in Zapod and 7.7% in Shishtavec identified as ethnic Macedonians.

Education

There is a general high school in Pustec, one eight-year school in Dolna Goricë and six elementary schools in Shulin, Leskë, Zërnovskë, Dolna Goricë, Tuminec and Glloboçen. There are eight-year schools at the two biggest villages of the commune, Pustec and Goricë e Madhe, where 20 percent of the texts are held at the mother tongue language. At the centre of the commune there is a high school as well. The history of the Macedonian people is a special subject at the school. All minority schools have twin partnerships with counterparts in Macedonia. All the teaching personnel is local and with the proper education.

The Macedonian language will be taught in the pedagogical college of Korçë.

Culture

Religion
The Macedonians in Albania are predominantly Macedonian Orthodox and Muslim. The distribution of religions among Macedonians reflects the trend of confession in their non-Macedonian neighbors- Macedonians in more southerly regions share the Orthodox Christian faith with the high concentration of Albanian Orthodox believers of these regions, as well as local Aromanians and Greeks who are largely Orthodox, while as one goes further north, the proportion of Muslim Macedonians increases with the proportion of Muslim Albanians (which form a majority of some local Albanian areas in the northern parts). The Macedonian Muslims can be found primarily in the Gollobordë, Gora and Peshkopi regions, with smaller populations in the South of the country in places such as Rajca, etc. There are however substantial Orthodox Macedonian minorities in both the Gollobordë and Peshkopi regions. In the south of the country around Mala Prespa, Pogradec, Korçë and Bilisht, the Macedonians are mostly Orthodox.

The Community is currently in the process of building the first of many Macedonian Orthodox Churches. The Church 'St. Michael the Archangel' was started in the early 2000s. A new church is that of Saint Mary for which a considerable funding has been given by the Macedonian Orthodox Church.

Organizations
In September 1991 the "Bratska" Political Association of Macedonian in Albania (BPAMA) was established. Other Macedonian organizations include Macedonian Alliance for European Integration, Macedonian Society Ilinden Tirana, Prespa, Mir (Peace), Bratstvo (Brotherhood) and the MED (Macedonian Aegean Society).

In March 2012, Macedonians in Gollobordë formed "Most" (Macedonian for "Bridge"). The organisation's president, Besnik Hasani said that the group's goal is to "be fighting for recognition of Macedonians in Gollobordë  by the Albanian state and the introduction of the Macedonian language in schools... Also, our task will be to prevent the Bulgarian propaganda and efforts of Bulgaria for the Bulgarisation of the Macedonians in Gollobordë ."

Political parties

The Macedonians in Albanian are represented by the Macedonian Alliance for European Integration. In 2007 Edmond Temelko was elected to the position of Mayor of Pustec, and was reelected to this position in 2011, in which the party received ~2,500 votes. Edmond Osmani narrowly missed out being elected as Mayor of Trebisht, however 5 Macedonian counsellors were elected in Pustec, 3 in Trebisht, 2 in Bilisht and another in Pirg.

At present there is one Macedonian in the Albanian Parliament. But many of the local government representatives are Macedonian. The mayor of Pustec Municipality is Pali Kolefski according to 2019 local elections. He is a Macedonian. There are Macedonians represented in the districts of Zvezdë and Gorna Goricë.

Media

Radio
The local radio of Korçë broadcasts the Fote Nikola program which comprises news bulletins and songs in Macedonian for the Macedonian minority in Albania for half an hour each day. On November 7, 2002 the first private Macedonian-language radio station was set up. It is known as "Radio Prespa".

Television
The local TV station has also released programs from the Republic of Macedonia.  In November, 2010, the first Macedonian television station, Television Kristal, was officially launched.

Print media
Numerous forms of Macedonian language print media serve the needs of the Macedonians living in Albania. In the early 1990s the first Macedonian language periodical known as Mir (Peace) emerged. Later still the newspaper Prespa, began to be published by Macedonians living in the Mala Prespa region. The Macedonian newspaper 'Ilinden' was launched in April, 2011, by Macedonians living in Tirana.

Notable individuals
Nikola Berovski (1923–2013), educator and translator
Stefan Cvetkovski (1919 - 1944), Macedonian Yugoslav partisan
Takjo Grozdani, president of Prespa organization.
Vlado Makelarski (1919–1993), partisan
Spase Mazenkovski (1953–2018), writer and journalist
Sotir Risto, poet
Sterjo Spasse, writer
Edmond Temelko, former Mayor of the Pustec Municipality, and ethnic Macedonian rights activist
Koçi Xoxe, former Defence and Interior Minister of Albania

See also
Macedonians
Macedonian Party
Albania–North Macedonia relations
Albanians in North Macedonia
Bulgarians in Albania

References

External links
 Macedonian Society Ilinden – Tirana
 Macedonian Alliance for European Integration
 Albanian Helsinki Committee report on the Macedonians in Albania
 Ilinden Newspaper
 Latest Edition of the Prespa Newspaper
 Osce report of Minorities in Albania
 Republic of Albania
 ODIHR
 Photos of Macedonians in Albania
 World Directory of Minorities and Indigenous Peoples – Albania : Macedonians
 Makedonium

Multimedia
A video about the Ethnic Minority with both Albanian and Macedonian sources
Macedonians in Gora celebrating Gjurgovden
Macedonians in Pustec, Albania

 
Ethnic groups in Albania
Ethnic Macedonian people
Macedonian diaspora